De'an railway station is a railway station located in De'an County of Jiujiang, in Jiangxi province, eastern China.

It serves the Nanchang–Jiujiang intercity railway.

References

Jiujiang
Railway stations in Jiangxi
Stations on the Beijing–Kowloon Railway